Jessica McClure Morales (born March 26, 1986; widely known as "Baby Jessica" in 1987) fell into a well in her aunt's backyard in Midland, Texas, on October 14, 1987, at the age of 18 months.

The story garnered worldwide attention and was later featured in the 1989 ABC television movie Everybody's Baby: The Rescue of Jessica McClure.

Rescue 
The incident occurred in Midland, Texas, where firemen and police developed a plan to drill a parallel shaft to the well where Jessica was lodged—and drill another horizontal cross-tunnel to rescue her. Enlisting the help of local oil drillers, officials hoped to free McClure quickly, before discovering the well was surrounded by rock. The rescuers' jackhammers were also inadequate, as they were designed for downward rather than horizontal drilling.

A mining engineer eventually arrived to help supervise and coordinate the rescue effort, and a relatively new technology, waterjet cutting, was ultimately used to cut through the rock.

Forty-five hours after Jessica fell into the well, the adjacent shaft and cross-tunnel were complete. During the drilling, rescuers could hear Jessica singing "Winnie the Pooh."

A roofing contractor, Ron Short, volunteered to go down the shaft.  He had been born without collarbones and could collapse his shoulders to work in tight confines. The team considered his offer, but paramedic Robert O'Donnell was ultimately able to inch his way into the tunnel, wrestle Jessica free from her position pinned inside the well with one leg above her forehead—and hand her to a fellow paramedic, who carried her up to safety before giving her to another paramedic who carried her to a waiting ambulance.

Media coverage 
CNN covered the rescue effort, with then-President Ronald Reagan saying "everybody in America became godmothers and godfathers of Jessica while this was going on." Throughout the incident, local media outlet KMID-TV received calls from news organizations and private individuals globally, seeking the latest information. In 1988, McClure and her parents appeared on Live with Regis and Kathie Lee to talk about the incident.

The photograph of McClure's rescue received the 1988 Pulitzer Prize for Spot News Photography to Scott Shaw of the Odessa American.

ABC made a television movie of the story in 1989, Everybody's Baby: The Rescue of Jessica McClure, starring Patty Duke and Beau Bridges and featuring many participants from the actual rescue as extras.

On May 30, 2007, USA Today ranked McClure number 22 on its list of "25 lives of indelible impact".

Aftermath 

Following McClure's rescue on October 16, 1987, doctors feared they would have to amputate Jessica's foot due to damage from loss of blood flow sustained from her leg being elevated above her head for the 58 and a half hours she was stuck in the well. They decided to try hyperbaric therapy in an attempt to avoid full amputation. In the end, surgeons only had to amputate a toe due to gangrene caused by loss of circulation while she was in the well. Jessica carries a scar on her forehead where her head rubbed against the well casing and despite the incident and 15 subsequent related surgeries, retains no first-hand memory of the events. Her parents divorced in 1990.

Paramedic Robert O'Donnell (born August 27, 1957 - April 27, 1995) died by suicide at the age of 37 by shooting himself in the head with a shotgun due to suffering from post-traumatic stress disorder after the rescue.

In May 2004, McClure graduated from Greenwood High School, in a small community near Midland. They met at a day care center where she worked with his sister. They have two children, a boy born in 2007 and a girl born in 2009.

However, she also indicated a great deal of the fund was lost in the 2008 stock market crash.

In popular culture 

 The Far Side Gary Larson created a comic entitled "The life and times of baby Jessica".
 Malootty, the 1990 Indian Malayalam-language movie starring Jayaram, was based on the incident.
 The Simpsons referenced the incident with an episode about Bart Simpson falling and becoming stuck inside a well.
 In 2010, blues musician Charlie Musselwhite released an album titled The Well. In the title song, he credits McClure's ordeal for inspiring him to quit drinking.
 In 2010, her story was featured satirically in the Saturday Night Live sketch "What Up With That."
 In 2017, an episode of ABC's Modern Family, titled "Heavy Is the Head", Cam (Eric Stonestreet) has great difficulty getting an MRI scan. He later attributes his fear to being stuck in a well as a teenager on the same day as Baby Jessica.
 The fictional narrator, Sloane Sheppard of the 2022 podcast, Wildflowers, by Terry Miles, tells of a childhood incident that happened to her which is loosely inspired by the Baby Jessica story. In her fictional version, Sloane was 3 when she was stuck in a well for 3 days while rescuers attempted to bore through bedrock. She was ultimately rescued by an engineer who was born without collar bones and thus able to slip through the narrow tunnel, presumably a reference to real-life Ron Short.

See also 
 Floyd Collins, an early case of "man trapped in cave" that received high media attention in 1925
 2010 Copiapó mining accident, cave-in and miner rescue at a mine in Atacama Region (Chile) where 33 miners were rescued
 Tham Luang cave rescue, where 12 children and a coach were rescued from a cave in Thailand in 2018
 Kathy Fiscus, a 3-year-old American girl who died after falling into a well in 1949
 Alfredo Rampi, a 6-year-old Italian boy who died after falling into a well in 1981
 Julen Roselló, a 2-year-old Spanish toddler who died after falling into a well in 2019
 Rayan Oram, a 5-year-old Moroccan boy who died after falling into a well in 2022
 Tikki Tikki Tembo, a children's book about a Chinese boy who fell into a well

References

External links 
 
"Jessica, from the Well" poem by Lucie Brock-Broido

1986 births
1987 in Texas
Living people
Accidents in North America
People from Midland, Texas
Cases of people who fell into a well BB:B4:69:5F:F4:55:56:77